Korea – United States relations may refer to:

 North Korea–United States relations
 South Korea–United States relations